Vastral is a posh locality and a municipality in Ahmedabad district in the Indian state of Gujarat.

Demographics
 India census, Vastral had a population of 41,925. Males constitute 55% of the population and females 45%. Vastral has an average literacy rate of 76%, higher than the national average of 59.5%: male literacy is 81%, and female literacy is 70%. In Vastral, 13% of the population is under 6 years of age.

References

Cities and towns in Ahmedabad district
Neighbourhoods in Ahmedabad